Sunrisers Hyderabad (SRH) are a franchise cricket team based in Hyderabad, India, which plays in the Indian Premier League (IPL). They were one of the eight teams that are competing in the 2015 Indian Premier League. This was their third outing in IPL. The team was being captained by David Warner and coached by Tom Moody with Muttiah Muralitharan as their bowling coach and VVS Laxman as the mentor for this team.

The Sunrisers started their campaign against Chennai Super Kings on April 11, 2015 at Chennai on a losing note and failed to qualify for Play-Offs finishing 6th at the end of the tournament. David Warner won the Orange Cap by scoring 562 runs in this IPL.

Background
They appointed Muttiah Muralitharan as their bowling coach for 2015 season

ACA-VDCA Stadium which is located in Visakhapatnam, Andhra Pradesh is selected as the Secondary Home Ground for the Sunrisers Hyderabad. It has a seating capacity of 38,000. Sunrisers Hyderabad played their first 3 home games at this ground.

Administration and support staff

 Owner – Kalanithi Maran (Sun Network)
 Head coach – Tom Moody
 Assistant coach – Simon Helmot
 Bowling coach – Muttiah Muralitharan
 Mentor – VVS Laxman & Kris Srikkanth
 Source :

Kit Manufacturers and Sponsors

 Source :

Players Auction 

The players auction for the 2015 Indian Premier League held on 16 February 2015. All eight franchises had participated in the auction. SRH has retained 13 players and released 11 players from the previous season. As a result of this retention the team had an auction purse of Rs 208.5 million. Added 10 players to the team. Later, there has been a replacement in the team with Bipul Sharma filling in for Laxmi Ratan Shukla.

Retained Players: David Warner, Shikhar Dhawan, Ashish Reddy, Bhuvneshwar Kumar, Chama Milind, Dale Steyn, Ishant Sharma, Karn Sharma, K. L. Rahul, Moises Henriques, Naman Ojha, Parvez Rasool, Ricky Bhui

Released Players: Aaron Finch, Amit Mishra, Amit Paunikar, Brendan Taylor, Darren Sammy, Irfan Pathan, Jason Holder, Manprit Juneja, Prasanth Parameswaran, Anirudha Srikkanth, Venugopal Rao

Added Players: Trent Boult, Praveen Kumar, Eoin Morgan, Ravi Bopara, Kane Williamson, Laxmi Ratan Shukla, Padmanabhan Prasanth, Hanuma Vihari, Siddarth Kaul, Kevin Pietersen

Replacement Players: Bipul Sharma

Squad 
 Players with international caps are listed in bold.
 Signed Year denotes year from which player is associated with the Sunrisers Hyderabad

Season Overview

Standings

Results by match

Fixtures

League stage

Statistics 

Full Table on Cricinfo

Awards and Achievements

Awards

 Man of the Match

 Season Awards
 Winner of Orange Cap: David Warner

Achievements
 David Warner becomes the First Player to score 50+ as a captain.
 Yes Bank Maximum Super Sixes Competition : Moises Henriques
 Hat-trick of Winning streak
 Best Catches of the season: David Warner
 Most Fours scored : David Warner 
 Best Bowling Average : Moises Henriques

Reaction
Ahead of the 2015 season, the IPL saw increase in its brand value by 9% to 3.54 billion while the Sunrisers' brand value was increased by 40% to 35 million, according to American Appraisal.

See also
List of Sunrisers Hyderabad records

References

External links
Sunrisers Hyderabad official website

Sunrisers Hyderabad seasons
Cricket in Hyderabad, India
2015 Indian Premier League